White Pass, also known as the Dead Horse Trail, (elevation ) is a mountain pass through the Boundary Ranges of the Coast Mountains on the border of the U.S. state of Alaska and the province of British Columbia, Canada. It leads from Skagway, Alaska, to the chain of lakes at the headwaters of the Yukon River, Crater Lake, Lake Lindeman, and Bennett Lake.

History
The White Pass was closely controlled by the Chilkoot Indians and was unknown to non-natives until 1887. William Ogilvie had heard reports of a low pass near the Deyes Inlet to the headwaters of the Lewes River (Yukon River), while in Juneau.  The Ogilvie expedition was on its way to the Yukon territory in order to survey and mark the international boundary on the Yukon River.  In June 1887, Ogilvie's expedition was at the head of Taiya Inlet doing a survey from Pyramid Island up through the Chilkoot Pass.  William Moore, who had travelled up from Juneau on the steamer, had experience building roads in mountainous areas and wanted to try this route since the Chilkoot Pass was reported to be too steep for a wagon road.  They had heard rumors about another lower pass that the Chilcoot Indians controlled.   Ogilvie made inquiries and learned there was such a pass.   An Indian named Jim, after much talk and encouragement, was persuaded to reveal it.    Moore and his guide went over this low altitude pass.   Ogilvie and his surveying party ascended the Chilkoot Pass.   Among the many Chilcoot Indians hired to carry their supplies up the pass was Skookum Jim Mason, who, with his family, discovered the rich Gold deposits in the Klondike.    Moore did a rough survey of the new pass and returned with the satisfaction that he had found the route for his wagon road. The White Pass was named for the Canadian Minister of the Interior Thomas White by William Ogilvie.

William Moore and his son returned to stake a homesteader's claim in Skagua, as it was then known.   They built a cabin and a wharf and surveyed a town site they called Mooresville. In 1894, the North-West Mounted Police arrived at Dyea and Mooresville on their way to Canada's Yukon Territory. The first group of prospectors hiked up Moore's crude trail over the White Pass. Once the gold rush began, the Moores were overrun.  Mooresville was resurveyed by Frank Reid as Skaguay.   The crude trail was made into a toll road by George A. Brackett, and the North-West Mounted Police guarded the passes and briefly maintained a post in Skaguay, which Canada claimed.

Gold rush years

The White Pass trail was one of the two main passes used by prospectors during the Klondike Gold Rush. The White Pass was an easier route to Lake Bennett than the Chilkoot Trail a few kilometers to the west, but it harbored a criminal element that preyed on the cheechakos (newcomers to the Klondike). These con artists were believed to be members of the infamous Soapy Smith gang from Skagway, Alaska. In 1898, Smith was killed at the famed Shootout on Juneau Wharf and his gang were run out of Skagway and the White Pass. So many horses died during the gold rush, the trail became known as the "Dead Horse Trail". The trail ended at Lake Bennett, where the prospectors built or purchased rafts or boats to float down the Yukon River to the Klondike gold fields near Dawson City.

 
The White Pass and Yukon Route (W.P. & Y.R.) narrow-gauge railroad was built 1898-1900 through White Pass. The southern end of the Klondike Highway also uses the White Pass and parallels the railway.

The Skagway Historic District and White Pass is a U.S. National Historic Landmark.

Due to the harsh climate, grueling conditions, and length of journey, travelers on both the Chilkoot Trail and White Pass suffered from widespread starvation. Many of the starving people on the White Pass made meals of dead horses they found along the road. Furthermore, some travelers were known to go insane, most likely due to rotting of bodies in the snow.

References

External links 

University of Washington Libraries Digital Collections – Eric A. Hegg Photographs  736 photographs from 1897 to 1901 documenting the Klondike and Alaska gold rushes, including depictions of frontier life in Skagway and Nome, Alaska and Dawson, Yukon Territory.  Includes images of White Pass and White Pass Trail.
content.lib.washington.edu

Klondike Gold Rush
Mountain passes of British Columbia
Mountain passes of Alaska
Landforms of the Municipality of Skagway Borough, Alaska
Atlin District
Rail mountain passes of the United States
Boundary Ranges
Canada–United States border crossings
Historic trails and roads in Alaska
Native American trails in the United States
Transportation in Municipality of Skagway Borough, Alaska